The PFL 9 mixed martial arts event for the 2021 season of the Professional Fighters League was held on August 27, 2021. This was the third event of the playoffs with the Featherweight and Light Heavyweight divisions competing. This event aired on ESPN2, with the prelims airing on ESPN+.

Background
The fight card marked the final playoff event with featherweights and light heavyweights competing in the playoff semifinals.

Headliners Brendan Loughnane and Movlid Khaybulaev met in a featherweight contest, each fighter looking for their first PFL Championship berth. Loughnane debuted in Season 2 with a pair of wins in one-off fights, while Khaybulaev fell short in the Season 2 quarterfinals after suffering a knockout loss against Daniel Pineda, who was later suspended for an anti-doping violation.

The other featherweight bracket saw the wrestling standout Bubba Jenkins, in his first PFL season, take on three-time PFL Playoff competitor Chris Wade and light heavyweights Cezar Ferreira and Marthin Hamlet met for a shot at fighting in the PFL Championship. The other light heavyweight bout saw Season 2 light heavyweight champ and No. 4 seed Emiliano Sordi take on UFC veteran Antônio Carlos Júnior.

At weigh-ins, Bobby Moffett weighed in at 148.2 pounds, missing weight by 2.2  pounds. The bout proceeded at catchweight and Moffett was fined a percentage of his purse, which went to Jason Knight.

Results

2021 PFL Light Heavyweight playoffs

2021 PFL Featherweight playoffs

See also 
List of PFL events
List of current PFL fighters

References

Professional Fighters League
2021 in mixed martial arts
August 2021 sports events in the United States
Events in Hollywood, Florida